Darrell Harris (born May 25, 1984) is an American professional basketball player for MKS Dąbrowa Górnicza of the Polish Basketball League (PLK). Standing at 2.05, he plays the center position. After two years at Rhode Island, Harris entered the 2007 NBA draft but was not selected in the draft's two rounds.

Professional career
After going undrafted in the 2007 NBA draft, Harris played in several teams in Europe. Harris played from 2009 to 2012, for Kotwica Kołobrzeg. The next two years he spent in the AZS Koszalin. In 2015, he signed with Koroivos.

On June 19, 2016, Harris returned to AZS Koszalin after 2 years.

After spending two seasons with King Wilki Morskie, on July 20, 2019, he has signed with MKS Dąbrowa Górnicza of the Polish Basketball League (PLK).

Personal life
Harris is married to a Polish woman.

References

External links
Esake.gr Profile
Eurobasket.com Profile
RealGM.com Profile

1984 births
Living people
American emigrants to Poland
American expatriate basketball people in Germany
American expatriate basketball people in Greece
American expatriate basketball people in Poland
American expatriate basketball people in Portugal
American expatriate basketball people in Spain
American expatriate basketball people in Uruguay
American men's basketball players
AZS Koszalin players
Barreirense Basket players
Basketball players from Cleveland
CB Canarias players
Centers (basketball)
Club Malvín basketball players
Greek Basket League players
Junior college men's basketball players in the United States
K.A.O.D. B.C. players
Koroivos B.C. players
Rhode Island Rams men's basketball players
SKK Kotwica Kołobrzeg players
Naturalized citizens of Poland